Josua de Grave (1643 in Amsterdam – 1712 in The Hague), was a Dutch Golden Age draughtsman and painter.

Biography
De Grave is best known for his topographical drawings of the Southern Netherlands, including Maastricht and some in France during the years 1667–1668, among which drawings of the military camps of Stadholder William III during the campaigns against the French in 1674–1676. He later refocussed on imaginary and Italianate landscapes, often with a strong accent on perspective. He became a member of the Haarlem Guild of St. Luke in 1659. His relationship to Timotheus de Graaf (1647-1724), a teacher of Jacob Appel has not been established. His topographical work is often confused with that of Valentijn Klotz (and his brother(?) Barnardus Klotz), with whom he made several travels together. He drew mostly in black or brown pen with grey wash. A few paintings of his, mostly with imaginary landscapes, are also known.

References

Josua de Grave on Artnet

Sources
B.J. van Hasselt. Drie tekenaars van topografische prenten in Brabant en elders: Valentijn Klotz, Josua de Grave en Constantijn Huygens jr. in Jaarboek "de Ghulden Roos" . Nr. 25 (1965) pag. 145–192. (Dutch)
M.H.Breitbarth-van der Stok. Josua de Grave, Valentinus Klotz en Barnardus Klotz, in Bulletin KNOB Nr. 68 (1969). (Dutch, summary in English)

External links
Vermeer and The Delft School, a full text exhibition catalog from The Metropolitan Museum of Art, which has material on Josua de Grave

1643 births
1712 deaths
Dutch Golden Age painters
Dutch male painters
Painters from Amsterdam
Painters from Haarlem